Scotinophara is a genus of shield bugs in the tribe Podopini.  At least 63 species have a widespread distribution in Europe, Africa, Asia and Australia.

Species
BioLib lists the following:
 Scotinophara acutangula Linnavuori, 1973
 Scotinophara affinis Haglund, 1868
 Scotinophara agusanortica Barrion, Joshi, Barrion-Dupo & Sebastian, 2007
 Scotinophara alegria Barrion, Joshi, Barrion-Dupo & Sebastian, 2007
 Scotinophara allanae Musgrave, 1930
 Scotinophara arkwata Barrion, Joshi, Barrion-Dupo & Sebastian, 2007
 Scotinophara bispinosa (Fabricius, 1798)
 Scotinophara calligera Bergroth, 1893
 Scotinophara ceylonica (Distant, 1901)
 Scotinophara cinerea (Le Guillou, 1841)
 Scotinophara coarctata (Fabricius, 1798)
 Scotinophara cornuta Horváth, 1893
 Scotinophara curvispina Schouteden, 1903
 Scotinophara depressa Linnavuori, 1974
 Scotinophara fibulata (Germar, 1839)
 Scotinophara fibulatus (Germar, 1839) - type species (as Podops fibulatus Germar)
 Scotinophara horvathi Distant, 1883
 Scotinophara ilonga Barrion, Joshi, Barrion-Dupo & Sebastian, 2007
 Scotinophara inermiceps (Breddin, 1900)
 Scotinophara inermis Haglund, 1868
 Scotinophara kabangkalanensis Barrion, Joshi, Barrion-Dupo & Sebastian, 2007
 Scotinophara kalinga Barrion, Joshi, Barrion-Dupo & Sebastian, 2007
 Scotinophara lamottei Villiers, 1951
 Scotinophara landangica Barrion, Joshi, Barrion-Dupo & Sebastian, 2007
 Scotinophara latiuscula Breddin, 1900
 Scotinophara limosa (Walker, 1867)
 Scotinophara longicornis Linnavuori, 1982
 Scotinophara longispina Schouteden, 1905
 Scotinophara lurida (Burmeister, 1834)
 Scotinophara lutheri Bergroth, 1914
 Scotinophara luzonica Barrion, Joshi, Barrion-Dupo & Sebastian, 2007
 Scotinophara madagascariensis Schouteden, 1903
 Scotinophara maguindanaoana Barrion, Joshi, Barrion-Dupo & Sebastian, 2007
 Scotinophara malayensis (Distant, 1903)
 Scotinophara midsayapensis Barrion, Joshi, Barrion-Dupo & Sebastian, 2007
 Scotinophara minor Ruckes, 1963
 Scotinophara mixta Linnavuori, 1970
 Scotinophara mlanga Barrion, Joshi, Barrion-Dupo & Sebastian, 2007
 Scotinophara molavica Barrion, Joshi, Barrion-Dupo & Sebastian, 2007
 Scotinophara montana Villiers, 1951
 Scotinophara nigra (Dallas, 1851)
 Scotinophara obscura (Dallas, 1851)
 Scotinophara ochracea (Distant, 1901)
 Scotinophara parva Yang, 1934
 Scotinophara pirurotonga Barrion, Joshi, Barrion-Dupo & Sebastian, 2007
 Scotinophara pseudoserrata Barrion, Joshi, Barrion-Dupo & Sebastian, 2007
 Scotinophara putikanica Barrion, Joshi, Barrion-Dupo & Sebastian, 2007
 Scotinophara scobinae (Distant, 1908)
 Scotinophara scottii Horváth, 1879
 Scotinophara scutellata Scott, 1880
 Scotinophara serrata (Vollenhoven, 1863)
 Scotinophara sicula (A. Costa, 1841)
 Scotinophara sororcula (Breddin, 1900)
 Scotinophara sorsogonensis Barrion, Joshi, Barrion-Dupo & Sebastian, 2007
 Scotinophara subalpina Bergroth, 1893
 Scotinophara sumatrensis Wongsiri, 1975
 Scotinophara tantanganica Barrion, Joshi, Barrion-Dupo & Sebastian, 2007
 Scotinophara tarsalis (Vollenhoven, 1863)
 Scotinophara tibialis (Signoret, 1861)
 Scotinophara trifurcata Barrion, Joshi, Barrion-Dupo & Sebastian, 2007
 Scotinophara westwoodi Bergroth, 1915
 Scotinophara yaoundea Linnavuori, 1982
 Scotinophara zamboanga Barrion, Joshi, Barrion-Dupo & Sebastian, 2007

References

External Links

Podopinae
Pentatomidae genera
Hemiptera of Asia
Hemiptera of Africa
Hemiptera of Europe